Hypercompe deflorata is a moth of the family Erebidae first described by Johan Christian Fabricius in 1775. It is found in Ecuador.

Subspecies
Hypercompe deflorata deflorata
Hypercompe deflorata quitensis Oberthür, 1881

References

deflorata
Moths described in 1775
Taxa named by Carl Linnaeus